"On My Own" is a song by electronic music trio Peach (known as Peach Union in the US). It was their only hit on the Billboard Hot 100, peaked at #39 on the week ending October 11, 1997.

Charts

Weekly charts

Year-end charts

References

1997 singles
1997 songs
Epic Records singles
Songs written by Pascal Gabriel
Songs written by Paul Statham